Betta stigmosa is a species of gourami. It is a freshwater fish native to Asia, where it occurs only in the state of Terengganu in Malaysia. It is typically found in hillstreams. The species reaches 4.1 cm (1.6 inches) in standard length and is known to be a facultative air-breather.

References 

Fish described in 2005
stigmosa